Eun-kyung, also spelled Eun-kyeong, or Eun-kyong, Eun-gyoung, Un-kyong, Un-gyong, is a Korean feminine given name. Its meaning differs based on the hanja used to write each syllable of the name. There are 30 hanja with the reading "eun" and 74 hanja with the reading "kyung" on the South Korean government's official list of hanja which may be registered for use in given names. In 1970, Eun-kyung was the 5th-most popular name for baby girls born in South Korea, falling to 8th place by 1980.

People with this name include:

Entertainers
Kang Eun-kyung (born 1971), South Korean television screenwriter
Shin Eun-kyung (born 1973), South Korean actress
Lim Eun-kyung (born 1984), South Korean actress
Shim Eun-kyung (born 1994), South Korean actress

Field hockey players
Chung Eun-kyung (born 1965), member of the South Korean team at the 1988 Summer Olympics
Choi Eun-kyung (field hockey) (born 1971), member of the South Korean team at the 1996 Summer Olympics
Lee Eun-kyung (field hockey) (born 1972), member of the South Korean team at the 1992 and 1996 Summer Olympics
Park Eun-kyung (field hockey) (born 1975), member of the South Korean team at the 2004 and 2008 Summer Olympics

Other sportspeople
Chang Eun-kyung (1951–1996), South Korean judo practitioner
Lee Eun-kyung (volleyball) (born 1961), South Korean volleyball player
Lee Eun-kyung (archer) (born 1972), South Korean archer
Ri Un-gyong (born 1980), North Korean football midfielder
Choi Eun-kyung (born 1984), South Korean short track speed skater
Choe Un-gyong (wrestler) (born 1991), North Korean freestyle wrestler
Kim Eun-kyeong (born 1991), South Korean handball player
Choe Un-gyong (diver) (born 1994), North Korean diver

See also
List of Korean given names

References

Korean feminine given names